The Whitewater River is a  southerly flowing right tributary of the Great Miami River in southeastern Indiana and southwestern Ohio in the United States. It is formed by the confluence of two forks, the West Fork and East Fork. The name is a misnomer, as there is no true white water on the river. The gradient rendered upstream navigation impossible, and in the mid-nineteenth century resulted in the construction of the Whitewater Canal paralleling the river from north of Connersville, Indiana, to the Ohio River.

It flows south, through Richmond, Indiana, and joins the West Fork of the river at Brookville, Indiana.

From the junction the Whitewater flows southeasterly into Ohio where it eventually joins the Great Miami River, a tributary of the Ohio River.

Following continual flooding problems on the East Fork, and to help control flooding in the Ohio River, the East Fork was dammed by the US Army Corps of Engineers to create Brookville Lake in 1974. Brookville Lake extends  from just south of Liberty, Indiana, to Brookville.

Cities and towns on the Whitewater River (north to south) include Hagerstown, Cambridge City, Connersville, Laurel, Metamora, Brookville, Harrison (Ohio), and Lawrenceburg. Richmond, Indiana is on the East Fork of the Whitewater River and is the most significant town in the river valley, containing most of the population of the valley.

Whitewater Valley
The region surrounding the Whitewater River is known as the Whitewater Valley. The melting Wisconsin ice cap starting about 21,000 years ago created the Whitewater Valley basin as we know it today. The Whitewater River and its valley were the main conduit of settlement of southeastern and eastern Indiana from Cincinnati and Clarksville (opposite Louisville) on the Ohio River during the first half of the nineteenth century, prior to the construction of railroads.

The Indianapolis and Cincinnati Railroad constructed a line known as the Whitewater Railroad in 1863-1868 on the tow path of the Whitewater Canal, from Hagerstown to just west of Cincinnati. It brought to an end the commercial importance of the river and the canal.

Recreation
The river today is devoted to scenic and recreational uses.

See also
 List of Indiana rivers
 List of rivers of Ohio

References

 
 

Rivers of Indiana
Rivers of Ohio
Rivers of Fayette County, Indiana
Rivers of Franklin County, Indiana
Rivers of Union County, Indiana
Rivers of Wayne County, Indiana